The Buran programme was an attempt by the Soviet Union to construct an orbital spaceplane to perform similar functions to the Space Shuttle. Similar to the Space Shuttle programme, an aerodynamic prototype and a number of operational spacecraft were planned for the Buran programme, which were known as "Buran-class orbiters".

Test flights

The aerodynamic testbed OK-GLI was constructed in 1984 to test the in-flight properties of the Buran design. Unlike the American prototype Enterprise, OK-GLI had four AL-31 turbofan engines fitted, meaning it was able to fly under its own power.

The list does not include taxi tests without takeoffs.
All of these missions were landed at the Gromov Flight Research Institute test base.

Launches and orbital flights
The first operational orbiter, Buran flew one test mission, designated 1K1, on November 15, 1988 at 6:00:00 Moscow time.  The spacecraft was launched unmanned from and landed at Baikonur Cosmodrome in the Kazakh S.S.R. and flew two orbits, traveling  in 3 hours, 25 minutes (0.14 flight days). Buran never flew again; the program was cancelled shortly after the dissolution of the Soviet Union. In 2002, the collapse of the hangar in which it was stored destroyed the Buran orbiter.

Cancelled missions

Planned in 1989

Planned in 1991

Due to shortening of the program and delays in second flight preparations, mission plan for second orbiter included almost all significant test tasks. 
 automatic docking with Mir's Kristall module
 crew transfer from Mir to the shuttle, with testing of some of its systems in the course of twenty-four hours, including the remote manipulator
 undocking and autonomous flight in orbit
 docking of the crewed Soyuz-TM №101 with the shuttle
 crew transfer from the Soyuz to the shuttle and onboard work in the course of twenty-four hours
 automatic undocking and landing

See also
 List of Space Shuttle missions

References

Missions
Lists of space missions